Addi Amharay is a reservoir located in the Inderta woreda of the Tigray Region in Ethiopia. The earthen dam that holds the reservoir was built in 1997 by SAERT.

Dam characteristics 
 Dam height: 14.7 metres
 Dam crest length: 128 metres
 Spillway width: 17 metres

Capacity
 Original capacity: 957,000 m³
 Dead storage: 175,000 m³
 Reservoir area: 31.5 ha
In 2001, the life expectancy of the reservoir before it is filled with sediment was estimated at only 33 years.

Irrigation
 Designed irrigated area: 60 ha
 Actual irrigated area in 2001: 5 ha

Environment
The catchment of the reservoir is 4.92 km², with a perimeter of 9.62 km and a length of 3560 metres. The reservoir suffers from rapid siltation.  The lithology of the catchment is Antalo Limestone and Agula shale. Part of the water that could be used for irrigation is lost through seepage; the positive side-effect is that this contributes to groundwater recharge.

References 

Reservoirs in Ethiopia
1997 establishments in Ethiopia
Tigray Region